For the 1992 Vuelta a España, the field consisted of 189 riders; 139 finished the race.

By rider

By nationality

References

Further reading

 Cyclists
1992